Prunus eremophila, also known by its common name Mojave Desert plum, is a rare species of plum native to California.

Description
Prunus eremophila is a bulky shrub with tangled, thorny branches.

They are lightly hairy in texture.

It blooms in March to April. The flowers occur singly or in pairs, each bearing small white petals. Either the stamens or pistils abort, leaving female or male flowers.

The plant was described to science only in 2001  or 2002 and little is known about its ecology.

Distribution 
The shrub is endemic to the Mojave Desert within northeastern San Bernardino County, California, where it is known only from the Vontrigger Hills and Lanfair Valley of the eastern Mojave National Preserve.  It occurs in desert scrub habitat.

Conservation 
The plant occurs in the Mojave National Preserve, so is protected from some human activity, but is a Critically Endangered species threatened by off-road vehicles, grazing, mining, and climate change.

References

External links
 Calflora Database: Prunus eremophila (Desert plum)
  Jepson eFlora (TJM2) treatment of 'Prunus eremophila'' 
 UC CalPhotos gallery: 'Prunus eremophila'' 

eremophila
Endemic flora of California
Flora of the California desert regions
Natural history of the Mojave Desert
Lanfair Valley
Mojave National Preserve
Natural history of San Bernardino County, California
Plants described in 2002
Critically endangered flora of California